The Province of Oulu was a province of Finland from 1775 to 2009. It bordered the provinces of Lapland, Western Finland and Eastern Finland and also the Gulf of Bothnia and Russia.

History 
For History, Geography and Culture see: Ostrobothnia

The Province of Oulu was established in 1775 when Finland was an integrated part of Sweden from the northern part of Ostrobothnia County. The new province was named after its administrative seat of Oulu.

As a consequence of the tumultuous conflicts of the Napoleonic Wars, Sweden had allied itself with the Russian Empire, United Kingdom and the other parties of the Fourth Coalition against Napoleonic France. However, following the treaty of Treaty of Tilsit in 1807, Russia made peace with France and left the coalition. This enabled Russia in 1808 to challenge Sweden in the Finnish War, over the control of Finland. In the Treaty of Fredrikshamn on 17 September 1809 Sweden was obliged to cede all its territory in Finland, to Russia.

The ceded territories became a part of the Russian Empire and were reconstituted into the Grand Duchy of Finland, with the Russian Tsar as Grand Duke. The Province of Oulu was expanded in 1809 with the parts of the Västerbotten County (eastern part of the Torne Valley and historical Lapland).

After Finland became independent from Russia, in 1917, there were no changes in Oulu Province until 1938, when the northern part was split off and established as the Lapland Province.

All the provinces of Finland were abolished on 1 January 2010.

Administration 

The State Provincial Office was a joint regional authority of seven different ministries. It promoted national and regional objectives of the State central administration.

Regions 

The Province of Oulu was divided into two regions: 
Northern Ostrobothnia (Pohjois-Pohjanmaa / Norra Österbotten)
Kainuu (Kainuu / Kajanaland).

Municipalities in 2009 (cities in bold) 
The Province of Oulu was divided into 43 municipalities in 2009.

Alavieska
Haapajärvi
Haapavesi
Hailuoto
Haukipudas
Hyrynsalmi
Ii
Kajaani
Kalajoki
Kempele
Kiiminki
Kuhmo
Kuusamo
Kärsämäki
Liminka
Lumijoki
Merijärvi
Muhos
Nivala
Oulainen
Oulu
Oulunsalo
Paltamo
Pudasjärvi
Puolanka
Pyhäjoki
Pyhäjärvi
Pyhäntä
Raahe
Reisjärvi
Ristijärvi
Sievi
Siikajoki
Siikalatva
Sotkamo
Suomussalmi
Taivalkoski
Tyrnävä
Utajärvi
Vaala
Vihanti
Yli-Ii
Ylivieska

Former municipalities (disestablished before 2009) 

Kajaanin mlk
Oulujoki
Paavola
Rautio
Revonlahti
Saloinen
Kestilä
Kuivaniemi
Pattijoki
Piippola
Pulkkila
Rantsila
Ruukki
Temmes
Vuolijoki
Ylikiiminki

Governors 
Carl Magnus Jägerhorn 1775–1782
Adolf Tandefelt 1782–1785
Johan Fredrik Carpelan 1785–1800
Samuel af Forselles 1800–1802
Adolf Edelsvärd 1802–1804
Jakob Daniel Lange 1805–1808
Carl Henrik Ehrenstolpe 1809–1820
Samuel Fredrik von Born 1820–1826
Johan Abraham Stjernschantz 1826–1834
Robert Wilhelm Lagerborg 1834–1849
Alexander Lavonius 1849–1862
George von Alfthan 1862–1873
Otto Nyberg 1873–1879
Carl Johan Jägerhorn 1878–1883
Carl Adolf Tamelander 1883–1884
Johan Gabriel Masalin 1884–1886
Johan Axel Gripenberg 1886–1889
Anders Johan Malmgren 1889–1897
Gustaf Esaias Fellman 1897–1901
Edvard Furuhjelm 1901–1903
Otto Savander 1903–1905
Guido Gadolin 1905–1911
Hjalmar Langinkoski 1911–1915
Axel Fabian af Enehjelm 1915–1917
Matts von Nandelstadh 1917–1925
Eero Pehkonen 1925–1948
Kaarle Määttä 1949–1967
Niilo Ryhtä 1967–1973
Erkki Haukipuro 1973–1986
Ahti Pekkala 1986–1991
Eino Siuruainen 1991–2009

References

External links 
Oulu State Provincial Office – Official site
Ouluphotos.com

 
Provinces of Finland (1917–97)
Provinces of Finland (1997–2009)
States and territories established in 1775
States and territories disestablished in 2010